Jack Bowes (born 26 January 1998) is an Australian rules footballer playing for the Geelong Football Club in the Australian Football League (AFL), having previously played for the Gold Coast Suns.

Early life
Bowes was born and raised in Cairns, Queensland and attended St Augustine's College. His great uncle, Bill Bowes, was an international English cricketer who famously bowled Don Bradman on the first ball in the 1932–33 Ashes series. Jack began playing junior football with the Manunda Hawks Australian Football club before moving to the Cairns Saints Football Club in the AFL Cairns competition. As a junior, he was a standout and was placed in the Gold Coast Football Club's academy at the age of thirteen. In 2014, he made his senior debut for Cairns Saints as a sixteen year old and went on to play in a losing AFL Cairns seniors grand final that year where he managed a goal in a sixteen-point loss to Port Douglas. 

He made the decision to relocate to the Gold Coast at the beginning of 2015 to increase his chances of being drafted. There he continued playing football for the Surfers Paradise Australian Football Club in the Queensland Australian Football League (QAFL) as well as Gold Coast's reserves team in the North East Australian Football League (NEAFL). His 2015 NEAFL debut for the Gold Coast reserves included twenty-two disposals and one goal. He was selected to represent the under 17 AFL academy team in the 2015 AFL Grand Final curtain raiser and shone in a sixteen possession performance. He also completed his schooling in 2015 at All Saints Anglican School.

Bowes entered the final year of his junior football in 2016 and was predicted by many analysts to be selected with the first pick in the 2016 AFL draft. Bowes was named captain of the Queensland team that would compete in the 2016 division two AFL Under 18 Championships and led the team to several victories, the best being against Northern Territory. His performances in the championships saw him rewarded with the Hunter Harrison Medal as the best division two player.

Bowes was then selected to captain the Allies in the division one championships and was named in the 2016 under 18 All-Australian team as a result of his performances for the Allies. He was also chosen to represent team Judd in the 2016 all stars under-18 clash at Punt Road Oval, where he amassed twenty-three disposals.

AFL career
Bowes was recruited by the Gold Coast Football Club with their fourth selection and tenth overall in the 2016 national draft; he was initially bid on by the Sydney Swans, but Gold Coast matched the bid.

In 2019, Bowes started with a run with role player. He put down players like Fyfe and Cripps. Bowes had a quad injury in the middle of the season, but recovered from it. Jack Bowes averaged 18.3 disposals and 3.7 tackles.   Jack Bowes bringing big midfielders down.

On April 2019 Bowes famously kicked a goal in the final seconds of a match to snatch the lead from Carlton and ensure victory for the Suns.  Carlton at that time had traded away their first round pick to the Adelaide Crows, with this heart-breaking loss cementing them as likely favourites for the wooden spoon.  Adelaide Crows fans thereafter celebrated Bowes for his efforts.

Statistics
Updated to the end of the 2022 season.

|-
| 2017 ||  || 29
| 11 || 2 || 2 || 76 || 61 || 137 || 32 || 25 || 0.2 || 0.2 || 6.9 || 5.5 || 12.5 || 2.9 || 2.3
|-
| 2018 ||  || 29
| 16 || 4 || 5 || 174 || 85 || 259 || 67 || 37 || 0.3 || 0.3 || 10.9 || 5.3 || 16.2 || 4.2 || 2.3
|-
| 2019 ||  || 3
| 15 || 6 || 3 || 139 || 137 || 276 || 53 || 55 || 0.4 || 0.2 || 9.3 || 9.1 || 18.4 || 3.5 || 3.7
|-
| 2020 ||  || 3
| 17 || 1 || 0 || 195 || 95 || 290 || 69 || 30 || 0.1 || 0.0 || 11.5 || 5.6 || 17.1 || 4.1 || 1.8
|-
| 2021 ||  || 3
| 19 || 1 || 2 || 307 || 97 || 404 || 97 || 38 || 0.1 || 0.1 || 16.2 || 5.1 || 21.3 || 5.1 || 2.0
|-
| 2022 ||  || 3
| 5 || – || – || 58 || 20 || 78 || 18 || 7 || 0.0 || 0.0 || 11.6 || 4.0 || 15.6 || 3.6 || 1.4
|- class=sortbottom
! colspan=3 | Career
! 83 !! 14 !! 12 !! 949 !! 495 !! 1444 !! 336 !! 192 !! 0.2 !! 0.1 !! 11.4 !! 6.0 !! 17.4 !! 4.0 !! 2.3
|}

Notes

References

External links

1998 births
Living people
Australian rules footballers from Queensland
Gold Coast Football Club players
Sportspeople from Cairns